Lizie Lindsay is Child ballad 226 (Roud 94), existing in several variants (also known as "Lizzie Lindsay" or "Leezie Lindsay").

Synopsis

A highland Laird courts Lizie Lindsay in Edinburgh, sometime after his mother had warned him not to hide his highland origins.  Her family warns him off, but her maid encourages her.  She finds the highlands hard, but finally he brings her to his family, where he is a lord, and makes her the lady of a great castle.

In some variants, she is told when he is wooing her in Edinburgh that he is a lord, and that is what persuades her to go.

See also
Dugall Quin
The Beggar-Laddie
Glasgow Peggie
Bonny Lizie Baillie

External links
Lizie Lindsay
Leezie Lindsay

Child Ballads